Jānis Paipals (born 28 September 1983 in Gulbene) is a Latvian cross-country skier who has competed since 2006.  At the 2010 Winter Olympics, he finished 62nd in the individual sprint, 72nd in the 15 km, and was lapped during the 15 km + 15 km double pursuit event.

At the FIS Nordic World Ski Championships 2009 in Liberec, Paipals finished 67th in the individual sprint and did not finish the 15 km + 15 km double pursuit event.

His best overall finish was sixth in a 10 km event at Latvia in 2007.

References

External links
 
 
 

1983 births
Living people
Latvian male cross-country skiers
Cross-country skiers at the 2010 Winter Olympics
Cross-country skiers at the 2014 Winter Olympics
Olympic cross-country skiers of Latvia
People from Gulbene